Lambchop, originally Posterchild, is an American band from Nashville, Tennessee. AllMusic referred to them as "arguably the most consistently brilliant and unique American group to emerge during the 1990s".

Description and history

Never a band with a "core" lineup, Lambchop has consisted of a large and fluid collective of musicians focused around its creative centre, frontman Kurt Wagner.  Lambchop is loosely associated with the alternative country genre. Initially indebted to traditional country, the music has subsequently moved through a range of influences including post-rock, soul and lounge music.

Whatever the style, the characteristic mood of Lambchop's music is evoked by Wagner's distinctive songwriting: lyrically subtle and ambiguous, the vocals melodic but understated. American Songwriter described Wagner's lyrics as "witty and deeply insightful."  

They were the backing band for Vic Chesnutt on his 1998 album The Salesman and Bernadette.

Singer Kurt Wagner is married to founder of Nashville 90's record store, Lucy's Record Shop and Tennessee Democratic Party leader Mary Mancini.

Personnel

Summary of members as credited on studio albums (1994–present)

Former bass player Marc Trovillion died of a heart attack in October 2013, aged 56.

Discography

Releases as Posterchild
"An Open Fresca" / "A Moist Towlette" (split with Crop Circle Hoax) (1992)

Cassettes
 Secret Secret Sourpuss  (1990) 
 Big Tussie  (1992)
 Sorry About The Deformed Heart  (split with Crop Circle Hoax and Spent) (1993)

Singles
"Nine" / "Moody Fucker" (1993) 
"My Cliche" / "Loretta Lung" (1994) 
"Soaky in the Pooper" (1994) 
"Your Life As A Sequel" (1995)
"Scared Out Of My Shoes" (split 5" vinyl single with Spent) (1995) 
"The Man Who Loved Beer" (1996) 
"Hank" (1996) 
"Cigaretiquette" / "Mr. Crabby" (1996) 
"Whitey" / "Playboy, the Shit" (1997) 
"Give Me Your Love (Love Song)" (1998) 
"Your Fucking Sunny Day" (1998) 
"Up with People!" / "Miss Prissy" (2000)
"Is a Woman" (2002)
"Something's Going On (And On)" (2004)
"The Hustle" / "When You Were Mine" (2017)

Studio albums

Compilation albums
Tools in the Dryer (2001)
The Decline of the Country and Western Civilization (1993-1999) (2006) 
The Decline of Country and Western Civilization, Part 2: The Woodwind Years (2006) 
Broken Hearts & Dirty Windows: Songs of John Prine (2010)
Turd Goes Back: Essential Tracks from Secret Secret Sourpuss & Big Tussie (2011)

Tour only albums
Pet Sounds Sucks (Live at The Great American Music Hall, San Francisco) (2002) 
Mono (Live in Würselen, Germany) (2003-04) 
Nashville Does Dallas (2004)
Boo Fucking Who? (Live in Brussels, Belgium) (2004)
Succulence (Live in Vienna, Austria) (2006)
Rainer on My Parade (Live, various locations) (2008) 
Democracy (2012)
Live At The Shanghai Symphony Chamber Hall (2017)

EPs
Hank (1996) 
The Queens Royal Trimma (Live Royal Festival Hall, London – Tour Only) (2000) Treasure Chest of the Enemy (Tour Only) (2001)CoLab (with Hands Off Cuba) (2005)Mr. N (2012) Basement Tapes (2019)

Live albumsLive at XX Merge (2009) 

DVDsNo Such Silence'' (2007)

References

External links

 

Musical groups from Nashville, Tennessee
American alternative country groups
Musical groups established in 1986
1986 establishments in Tennessee
Chamber pop musicians
Merge Records artists
City Slang artists